Hans Martin (29 April 1913 – 30 May 2005) was a Swiss racing cyclist. He rode in the 1936 Tour de France.

References

External links
 

1913 births
2005 deaths
Swiss male cyclists
Place of birth missing
Tour de Suisse stage winners